"When Lovers Become Strangers" is the third US single release from American singer/actress Cher's 20th album, Love Hurts (1991), released in US and Canada only in late May 1992.

Critical reception
Larry Flick from Billboard wrote, "Third shot from Cher's fine Love Hurts album is a mournful pop ballad, fueled with a memorable hook and a restrained vocal. Soft, easygoing arrangement will fit equally well within AC and top 40 formats." A reviewer from Cashbox called it a "rock ballad", adding that it "features a more AOR production and seems like more the direction she wants to go."

Track listing
US promotional CD single
"When Lovers Become Strangers" (Edit) – 4:15
"When Lovers Become Strangers" (LP Version) – 4:46

Charts

References

External links
Official Cher site

1992 singles
Cher songs
Songs written by Diane Warren
1991 songs
Geffen Records singles